Malpaís is a band from Costa Rica.  The music of Malpaís is part of the Costa Rica-contemporary compositions work, called by the band "Costarican new song". The musicians are trying to relate the concept to the early folk and protest folk tradition of Latin America, mixing musical structures of regional and local folk genres such as calypso and tambito with easy-listening jazz (breaks and progressions) and romantic lyrics inspired in Latin American songwriters in order to be perceived as if they are built on the solid tradition of their musical roots. The group takes its name from the most remote, jungle-cradled beach on the north-Pacific Nicoya Peninsula—the beach at road’s end.

Members

Current members
 Jaime Gamboa — Bass, backing vocalist
 Iván Rodríguez — Violin, mandolin, backing vocalist
 Gilberto Jarquín — Drums
 Manuel Obregón — Piano, keyboard, marimba, caracol, backing vocalist and former Costa Rican Minister of Culture (2010–2014, under the administration of Laura Chinchilla, elected president of the ruling party).
 Carlos "Tapado" Vargas — Drums, percussion
 Daniela "Dani" Rodríguez— backing vocalist

Former members
 Patricio "Pato" Barraza
 Bernardo Quesada
 Fidel Gamboa (Deceased 28 August 2011)

Discography

Studio albums

Live albums

References

External links
 

Costa Rican musical groups